Luiz Albuquerque Couto (born 13 February 1945) is a Brazilian politician as well as a university professor and Catholic priest. He has spent his political career representing his home state of  Paraíba, having served as state representative from 2003 to 2019.

Personal life
Couto was born to Antônio Joaquim de Couto and Elisa Leopoldina de Albuquerque. His parents were landless farmers and Couto grew up in a poor environment. He is an alumnus of the Federal University of Paraíba. Couto attended seminary from 1974 to 1978, and on 19 December 1978 Couto was ordained to the Catholic priesthood. Couto has also worked as a professor, teaching theology, anthropology, and philosophy at various universities in Paraíba. On 22 December 2018 Couto celebrated mass commemorating 40 years of him being a priest. Couto is a proponent of Liberation theology.

Despite the Catholic church's teachings regarding homosexuality, Couto has spoken against the discrimination of LGBTQ individuals in Brazil and has also encouraged the use of condoms as a way to prevent HIV/AIDs. Because of his defense of the usage of condoms, Couto was suspended from the duties of the priesthood in 2009.

Political career
Couto voted against the impeachment motion of then-president Dilma Rousseff. Couto voted against the 2017 Brazilian labor reform, and he would vote in favor of a corruption investigation into Rousseff's successor Michel Temer.

Couto was investigated in December 2018 for alleged irregularities in campaign finance during the 2018 Brazilian general election.

References

1945 births
Living people
People from Paraíba
Federal University of Paraíba alumni
20th-century Brazilian Roman Catholic priests
Brazilian Christian socialists
Laicized Roman Catholic priests
Liberation theologians
Workers' Party (Brazil) politicians
Members of the Chamber of Deputies (Brazil) from Paraíba
Members of the Legislative Assembly of Paraíba
21st-century Brazilian Roman Catholic priests